Fairy Stone State Park, located in Patrick County, Virginia, is the largest of the original six state parks that opened on June 15, 1936, and is home to the mysterious "fairy stones", or staurolite. The stone, prevalent in the region, may have the St. Andrew's or Roman shape.

The park's land was donated in 1933 by Junius B. Fishburn, former president of the Southwest Virginia Trust Co. and former owner of the Roanoke Times. Some of the park's features, including its lake and many structures still in use, were built by the Civilian Conservation Corps.

References

External links
 
 Fairy Stone State Park Web Site
 Fairy Stone State Park in World Database on Protected Areas

Parks on the National Register of Historic Places in Virginia
Historic districts on the National Register of Historic Places in Virginia
State parks of Virginia
Parks in Patrick County, Virginia
National Register of Historic Places in Henry County, Virginia
Civilian Conservation Corps in Virginia
Protected areas established in 1936
1936 establishments in Virginia